Zhou Xin (died 196) was a Chinese politician who lived during the late Eastern Han dynasty of China.

Life
Zhou Xin was from Kuaiji Commandery, which is around present-day Shaoxing, Zhejiang. He had two brothers: Zhou Yu (Renming) and Zhou Ang. In his youth, he visited the imperial capital Luoyang and studied under the tutelage of Chen Fan. After he grew up, he entered government service and was appointed as the Administrator of Danyang Commandery (丹陽郡; around present-day Nanjing, Jiangsu).

In 189, when the warlord Cao Cao was recruiting soldiers to participate in a campaign against the warlord Dong Zhuo, who controlled the Han central government from 189 to 192, Zhou Xin and his brother Zhou Yu managed to draft 2,000 soldiers and brought them along to join Cao Cao.

In the 190s, when the warlord Yuan Shu dominated the territories in the Huai River region, Zhou Xin refused to engage him in any way because he despised Yuan Shu for his cruelty and extravagance. Zhou Xin and his brother Zhou Yu were also caught up in the conflict between Yuan Shu and Yuan Shao, Yuan Shu's half-brother and rival. In 192, Yuan Shu's forces defeated Zhou Xin's brother Zhou Yu in a battle at Yinling County (陰陵縣; northwest of present-day Changfeng County, Anhui). Later, Yuan Shu sent Wu Jing to lead troops to attack Zhou Xin. When Wu Jing announced that everyone who followed Zhou Xin would be killed, Zhou Xin said, "Even if I were at fault, why should he drag civilians into this conflict?" He then relinquished command of his troops, disbanded his forces and returned home to Kuaiji Commandery.

In 196, Zhou Xin came into conflict with the warlord Sun Ce, who was on a series of conquests in the Jiangdong region, where Kuaiji Commandery was. Wang Lang, the Administrator of Kuaiji Commandery, ordered Zhou Xin to lead troops to attack Sun Ce. Sun Ce defeated Zhou Xin in battle and killed him.

See also
 Lists of people of the Three Kingdoms

References

 Chen, Shou (3rd century). Records of the Three Kingdoms (Sanguozhi).
 
 Fan, Ye (5th century). Book of the Later Han (Houhanshu).
 Pei, Songzhi (5th century). Annotations to Records of the Three Kingdoms (Sanguozhi zhu).

196 deaths
Year of birth unknown
Officials under Cao Cao
Han dynasty people killed in battle
Han dynasty politicians from Zhejiang
Political office-holders in Anhui
Politicians from Shaoxing